The Journal of Statistical Planning and Inference is a monthly peer-reviewed scientific journal covering research on statistical inference. The editors-in-chief are A. DasGupta, H. Dette and W.-L. Loh. The journal was established in 1977. According to the Journal Citation Reports, the journal has a 2012 impact factor of 0.713.

References

External links 
 

Statistics journals
Publications established in 1977
Monthly journals
English-language journals
Elsevier academic journals